Perunthenaruvi Project is a tourism and hydroelectric power project at Perunthenaruvi near Vechoochira in Ranni, Kerala, India. The Kerala Tourism Development Corporation has launched the Perunthenaruvi tourism project as part of the eco-tourism chain linking Achankovil, Gavi, Konni and Ranni.

In 22 October 2017, the Chief Minister of Kerala launched the 6-MW hydroelectric power project by Kerala State Electricity Board in Perunthenaruvi. It is the smallest hydroelectric power project in the Pamba River.

Gallery

See also
 Perunthenaruvi Falls

References

Tourist attractions in Pathanamthitta district